The 2009 Cork Intermediate Hurling Championship was the 100th staging of the Cork Intermediate Hurling Championship since its establishment by the Cork County Board in 1909.  The draw for the opening round fixtures took place on 13 December 2008. The championship began on 2 May 2009 and ended on 13 September 2009.

On 13 September 2009, Valley Rovers won the championship after a 1–17 to 1–13 defeat of Kilworth in the final at Páirc Uí Chaoimh. This was their second championship title overall and their first title since 1989.  Delanys returned to junior status for the first time in 21 years after suffering a five-point defeat by Ballygarvan in a relegation play-off.

Kilworth's Adrian Mannix was the championship's top scorer with 2-49.

Team changes

To Championship

Promoted from the Cork Junior A Hurling Championship
 Dripsey

Relegated from the Cork Premier Intermediate Hurling Championship
 Aghada

From Championship

Promoted to the Cork Premier Intermediate Hurling Championship
 Carrigaline

Relegated to the City Junior A Hurling Championship
 St. Finbarr's

Results

First round

Second round

Third round

Relegation playoffs

Quarter-finals

Semi-finals

Final

Championship statistics

Top scorers

Overall

In a single game

References

Cork Intermediate Hurling Championship
Cork Intermediate Hurling Championship